Fairhurst is an English habitational surname, and may refer to a now vanished hamlet near Parbold in Lancashire.   The name is derived from Old English fæger (meaning beautiful) with hyrst (wooded hill).

People
 Zac Fairhurst (2006-present)
 John Fairhurst (1953-present)
English artist working in watercolour and oils also photography and video
Angus Fairhurst (1966–2008), English artist working in installation, photography and video
Billy Fairhurst (1902–1979), English football player
David Fairhurst (1906–1972), English football player
Dick Fairhurst (1911–?), English football player
Ed Fairhurst (born 1979), Canadian rugby player
Fiona Fairhurst, English textile designer; inventor of the Speedo Fastskin swimsuit
Frank Fairhurst (1892–1953), English politician
Harry S. Fairhurst (1868–1945), British architect
Horace Fairhurst (1893–1921), English footballer
Liam Fairhurst (1995–2009), British charity fundraiser
Mary Fairhurst (born 1957), American lawyer
Sue Fairhurst (born 1974), English-born Australian softball player
Susan Sutherland Isaacs (née Fairhurst; 1885–1948), British psychologist
Theodore Fairhurst (born 1947), Canadian artist, entrepreneur and mountain climber
Waide Fairhurst (born 1989), English footballer
William Fairhurst (2008–2018), British and New Zealand chess master and bridge designer

Company
Fairhurst (company), a British engineering consultancy